Cefclidin (also known as cefclidin, cefaclidine, or E1040) is a cephalosporin antibiotic.

References

Cephalosporin antibiotics
Quinuclidines
Thiadiazoles